Andrew Haslam (June 23, 1846 – April 10, 1923) was an Irish-Canadian sawmill-owner and Conservative politician. Born at Woodhill, Donegal, Ireland.

He served as the MLA for Nanaimo from 1889 to 1890. From 1892 to 1893, he was mayor of Nanaimo. He was chosen in an 1893 by-election to represent Vancouver in the House of Commons of Canada after the serving MP, David William Gordon died. Haslam was defeated in the 1896 general election.

He also served three terms on New Westminster City Council.

A road north of Nanaimo Airport was named for him.

References

External links
 

Conservative Party of Canada (1867–1942) MPs
1846 births
1923 deaths
Politicians from County Donegal
Irish emigrants to Canada (before 1923)
Members of the House of Commons of Canada from British Columbia
Mayors of Nanaimo
British Columbia Conservative Party MLAs